Smousje is a group of companion dog breeds, originally from Belgium. More specifically, it may refer to the specific breeds:
Griffon Bruxellois also known as the Brussels Griffon (FCI #80)
Belgian Griffon also known as the Griffon Belge (FCI #81)
Brabancon Griffon also known as the Petit Brabançon (FCI #82)